Five Points, Indiana may refer to:

Five Points, Allen County, Indiana
Five Points, Morgan County, Indiana
Five Points, Switzerland County, Indiana
Five Points, Union County, Indiana
Five Points, Warren County, Indiana
Five Points, Wells County, Indiana
Five Points, Whitley County, Indiana